Imāmzādeh Qasem is a tomb in Shiraz to Isfahan city in entries Zarghan located. Of about 10 years ago Board of Trustees of the shrine, and under the Religious Affairs Bureau and the basic work has been done. The Shrine of the gateway city and the road to Shiraz - Isfahan is located, as a tourism center - Zarghan prosperity and development in the pilgrimage town would be very effective. enshrine the silver on it for some years been installed and is now rebuilding the shrine, where it will end soon. Prince Qasim is located at the front entrance to the city every year for New Year's reception of guests.

See also
 List of Mosques in Iran
 Imamzadeh

Resources
 FA Wikipedia

Tombs in Iran
Ziyarat
Architecture in Iran
Buildings and structures in Fars Province